Zarraga, officially the Municipality of Zarraga,  is a 4th class municipality in the province of , Philippines. According to the 2020 census, it has a population of 27,305 people.

Geography

Barangays
Zarraga is politically subdivided into 24 barangays.

Climate

Demographics

Economy

References

External links
 [ Philippine Standard Geographic Code]
 Philippine Census Information
 Local Governance Performance Management System

Municipalities of Iloilo